The tenth season of Mira quién baila, also known as Mira quién baila All Stars premiered on Univision on October 9, 2022. The TV series is the American Spanish-language version of British version Strictly Come Dancing and American version Dancing with the Stars. This season features eight celebrities that are paired with eight professional ballroom dancers. The winner will receive a grand prize donation to the charity of their choice. Chiquinquirá Delgado returned as the show's host. Mane de la Parra joined as co-host, replacing Borja Voces. A new panel of judges was introduced, formed by Paulina Rubio, Isaac Hernández, and Roselyn Sánchez, replacing Dayanara Torres, Casper Smart, and Patricia Manterola. Sherlyn, contestant from the seventh season, is a backstage reporter. The winner, María León, received $35,000 for her chosen charity.

Celebrities 
The celebrities were announced on October 3, 2022.

Ratings

References

Dancing with the Stars
2022 American television seasons